USS Cuttyhunk Island (AG-75/AKS-23) was a Belle Isle-class miscellaneous auxiliary acquired by the U.S. Navy during World War II. Cuttyhunk Island was built as the war was coming to an end, and was used as a transport. She was later classified as a stores ship and eventually scrapped.

Constructed at Portland, Maine
Cuttyhunk Island (AG-75) was launched 26 November 1944 by New England Shipbuilding Corporation, South Portland, Maine, under a U.S. Maritime Commission contract; sponsored by Mrs. M. M. Dayo.

World War II-related service
Cuttyhunk Island was acquired by the Navy 7 December 1944; outfitted at Eureka Shipbuilding Corp., Newburg, New York; and commissioned 1 September 1945.
 
Cuttyhunk Island departed Norfolk, Virginia, 24 November 1945 to carry troops from Bermuda to Boston, Massachusetts.

Post-war decommissioning
She reported to Orange, Texas, 31 January 1946, and there was placed out of commission in reserve 3 May 1946. She was reclassified General Stores Issue Ship AKS-23, 18 August 1951.

References
 
 NavSource Online: Service Ship Photo Archive - AG-75 / AKS-23 Cuttyhunk Island

 

Basilan-class auxiliary ships
Ships built in Portland, Maine
1944 ships
World War II auxiliary ships of the United States
Liberty ships